Two Gun Justice is a 1938 American Western film directed by Alan James from a screenplay by Fred Myton. The film stars Tim McCoy and Betty Compson.

Cast list
Tim McCoy as Tim Carson
Betty Compson as Kate
Joan Barclay as Nancy Brown
John Merton as Bart Kane
Alan Bridge as Sheriff Tate
Tony Paton as Blinky
Allan Cavan as Tex
Lane Chandler as Butch
Harry Strang as Joe
Olin Francis as Blacky

References

1938 films
1938 Western (genre) films
American black-and-white films
American Western (genre) films
Films directed by Alan James
Monogram Pictures films
1930s American films